Dunfermline was a county constituency of the House of Commons of the Parliament of the United Kingdom from 1974 until 1983.

There was also an earlier Dunfermline Burghs constituency, from 1918 to 1974.

Boundaries 

The constituency was defined by the Second Periodical Review of the Boundary Commission, and first used in the February 1974 general election, as one of four constituencies covering the county of Fife. The other three constituencies were Central Fife, East Fife and Kirkcaldy.

The Dunfermline constituency covered the Dunfermline district of the county and the burghs of Culross, Dunfermline, and Inverkeithing.

February 1974 boundaries were used also in the general elections of October 1974 and 1979.

In 1975 Scottish counties and burghs were abolished under the Local Government (Scotland) Act 1973 and replaced with two-tier regions and districts and unitary islands council areas. The Third Periodical Review took account of new local government boundaries, and results were implemented for the 1983 general election. The Dunfermline constituency was divided between new Dunfermline East and Dunfermline West constituencies.

Members of Parliament

Election results

See also 
 Former United Kingdom Parliament constituencies

Notes and references 

Politics of Fife
Historic parliamentary constituencies in Scotland (Westminster)
Constituencies of the Parliament of the United Kingdom established in 1974
Constituencies of the Parliament of the United Kingdom disestablished in 1983
Politics of Dunfermline